The United Kingdom–Crown Dependencies Customs Union (UK-CD Customs Union)  or customs arrangements with the Crown Dependencies is a customs union that covers the British Islands. It eliminates all tariff and non-tariff barriers to trade between those islands, and creates a common external tariff with other countries.

Although each of the dependencies signed an individual agreement with the UK, these agreements include provision for the inclusion of the other dependencies creating a single customs area between the members.

On 1 January 2021, the United Kingdom extended its membership of the World Trade Organization (WTO) to the Channel Islands.

History 
Prior to the UK's exit from the EU, trade between the UK and Crown Dependencies was governed by protocol 3 of the UK's EU accession treaty.

On 26 November 2018, the UK signed customs agreements with each of the Crown Dependencies to allow free trade to continue to flow across between all the parties by creating a single UK–Crown Dependencies Customs Union.

On 29 December 2020, the UK–Crown Dependencies Customs Agreements took effect and officially created a customs union between the UK and Crown Dependencies.

Objectives 
The customs agreements:

 remove customs duties between members
 prohibit quantitive restrictions
 create a common external tariff
 create a shared safety and security zone
 create a joint customs committee
 create a single customs area.

These agreements also state that they may be terminated at any time by mutual agreement.

Common Transit Convention 
On 29 December 2020, the United Kingdom became an independent member of Common Transit Convention, this has been extended to the crown dependencies through the UK–Crown Dependencies customs union and is used as the basis for common transit between members.

Customs Alignment 
Paragraph 10, 11 & 12 specifies that members of the customs union will align with the UK in areas of customs laws, rules & procedures.

Joint UK-CD Customs Committee
The customs agreements created a joint customs committee (UK-CD Customs Committee). This committee will meet at least once a year and will act as a forum for:
 Exchanging views on common interests regarding the agreements 
 Reviewing the operation of the agreements 
 Seeking appropriate way and methods to avoid problems occurring in regard to areas covered in the agreements
 Mediation should problems occur regarding areas covered in the agreements.

Customs agreements

See also 
 Common Travel Area
 Trade agreements of the United Kingdom
 United Kingdom Internal Market Act 2020

References

Footnotes

External links 
 Customs arrangements with the Crown Dependencies
 The Customs (Crown Dependencies Customs Union) (EU Exit) Regulations 2019

2020 establishments in the United Kingdom
Customs unions
Economy of the Crown Dependencies
Economy of the United Kingdom
Economy of the Channel Islands
Economy of the Isle of Man